Antwerpen Linkeroever was the name of two different historical railway stations located on line 59 Antwerp-Ghent, in the Linkeroever area, Antwerp. The station was finally closed in 1984.

History 

The oldest station to be constructed at the location was opened on November 3, 1844 as station Vlaams Hoofd. After the annexation of the village of Vlaams-Hoofd by Antwerp in the name changed to station Antwerpen-West. After the opening of the St.-Annatunnel in 1933, the station was renovated in 1935 and renamed station Antwerpen-Linkeroever. This station at the Beatrijslaan was ultimately closed on February 1, 1970, being replaced by a new station located more to the West at the Katwilgweg. This second station was finally taken out of service on June 3, 1984 due to low ridership. Of the newer station, some remnants still remain in the form of two low-lying and non-maintained platforms located near the present building of the Gazet van Antwerpen.

References 

Public transport in Antwerp
Railway stations in Antwerp Province